Start Believin' is a Christian rock album by Steve Camp and was released by Myrrh Records in 1980.

Track listing 
 "The Feeling is Happening" (Morris "Butch" Stewart) - 6:02
 "You Are the Rainbow" (Steve Camp) - 3:12
 "Easy Livin' (Under the Sun)" (Camp) - 3:05
 "Ambassador in Chains" (Camp) - 3:51
 "Start Believin'" (Camp, Stewart, David Isaiah Radford) - 4:46
 "Under His Love" (Camp, Larry Norman) - 3:35
 "Do They Have to Grow Up?" (Paul Libman) - 3:56
 "I'll Always Need You Lord" (Stewart) - 5:47
 "Bobby" (Camp) - 5:19
 "Psalm 131" (Camp) - 2:10

Note: Never released on CD

Production
 Morris "Butch" Stewart – producer
 Hank Neuberger – recording, mixing
 Phil Bonono – engineer
 Gary Elgehammer – engineer
 Tommy Hanson – engineer
 Glenn Meadows – mastering at Masterfonics, Nashville, Tennessee

References 

1980 albums
Steve Camp albums
Myrrh Records albums